Andreia Marras  (born ) is a retired Brazilian female volleyball player. She was part of the Brazil women's national volleyball team.

She participated in the 1994 FIVB Volleyball Women's World Championship. On club level she played with L'Acqua di Fiori/Minas.

Clubs
 L'Acqua di Fiori/Minas (1994)

References

1971 births
Living people
Brazilian women's volleyball players
Brazilian people of Italian descent
Brazilian people of Sardinian descent
Place of birth missing (living people)